The 2016–17 Lebanese Premier League is the 56th season of top-tier football in Lebanon. A total of twelve teams are competing in the league, with Safa the defending champions. After 21 rounds, Al Ahed have won the league for the 5th time in its history. At the 21st round, Al Ahed needed a win against rivals Nejmeh SC to win the League but Nejmeh SC had forfeited and Al Ahed automatically won the match and became the champions of the Lebanese Premier League.

Teams 
Hekmeh FC and Shabab Al-Ghazieh were relegated to the second level of Lebanese football after ending the 2015–16 season in the bottom two places. They were replaced by Tadamon Sour and Al Akhaa Al Ahli who won promotion from the second tier.

Stadia and locations

Table

Top goalscorers

References

2016–17 Lebanese Premier League
Lebanese Premier League seasons
1
Leb